Ty Margenthaler (born August 27, 1971) is an American college basketball coach and a women's assistant coach at Samford University  in Homewood, Alabama. The Samford Bulldogs are members of the Southern Conference and compete in the NCAA's Division I.

Biography
A native of Macomb, Illinois, where his father, Jack, was coach at Western Illinois University, Margenthaler earned All-State basketball honors as a senior at Macomb High School. After graduating from Indian Hills Community College in Iowa, he transferred to Southern Illinois University Edwardsville where his father was the new head coach. Margenthaler was a two-year starter for the SIUE Cougars, scoring 831 points in 52 games, an average of 15.98 points per game. In addition to having a father as a basketball coach, his brother Matt is the men's head coach at Minnesota State University, Mankato.
Margenthaler and his wife, Julie, have two children, Brice and Nate. Brice Margenthaler his first son is currently playing a Carl Sandburg Junior College.

Coaching career
After graduating from SIUE in 1997 with a Bachelor of Arts degree in physical education and kinesiology, Margenthaler served as head coach at Roxana High School in Roxana, Illinois and as an assistant to SIUE Cougars women's coach Wendy Hedberg from 1997 to 1999. He worked as an assistant to head coach Paula Buscher at Bradley University, 2000–06, then from 2006 to 2011, he was an assistant to Lisa Stone at Wisconsin. On April 14, 2011, Margenthaler was named the head women's basketball coach at SEMO. He resigned on March 23, 2015. His appointment as an assistant coach at Samford University was announced on April 30, 2015. He was an assistant coach at Samford for 1 year than in the 2015-2016 season he was hired by his former boss Lisa Stone at Saint Louis University. He is now associate head coach at Saint Louis University.

Head coaching record

References 

1971 births
Living people
People from Macomb, Illinois
Basketball coaches from Illinois
Basketball players from Illinois
American men's basketball players
American women's basketball coaches
Bradley Braves women's basketball coaches
High school basketball coaches in the United States
Indian Hills Warriors basketball players
SIU Edwardsville Cougars men's basketball players
SIU Edwardsville Cougars women's basketball coaches
Southern Illinois University Edwardsville alumni
Wisconsin Badgers women's basketball coaches
Southeast Missouri State Redhawks women's basketball coaches